Albert Gordon MacRae (March 12, 1921 – January 24, 1986) was an American actor, singer and radio/television host who appeared in the film versions of two Rodgers and Hammerstein musicals Oklahoma! (1955) and Carousel (1956) and who played the leading man opposite Doris Day in On Moonlight Bay (1951) and sequel By The Light of the Silvery Moon (1953).

Early life
Born in East Orange in Essex County in northeastern New Jersey, United States, to Scottish parents, MacRae graduated in 1940 from Deerfield Academy in Deerfield, Massachusetts, and he thereafter served as a navigator in IX Troop Carrier Command in the United States Army Air Forces during World War II. Before this, he attended Nottingham High School in Syracuse, New York. Gordon was descended from the Clan MacRae.

Career

Singer
MacRae was a baritone. Winning a contest enabled him to sing at the 1939 New York World's Fair with the Harry James and Les Brown orchestras.

Broadway
He made his Broadway debut in 1942, acquiring his first recording contract soon afterwards. Many of his hit recordings were made with Jo Stafford.

He was a replacement performer on Junior Miss.

Radio
On radio in 1945, his talents were showcased on the Gordon MacRae Show on the CBS network in collaboration with the conductor Archie Bleyer. The show featured emerging musical talent, including the accordionist John Serry Sr. MacRae was also the host and lead actor on The Railroad Hour, a half-hour anthology series made up of condensed versions of hit Broadway musicals. The programs were later released as popular studio cast albums, most of which have been reissued on CD.

In 1946, he was in the revue Three to Make Ready, which ran for 326 performances.

Film
MacRae signed a contract with Warner Bros. in 1947. In 1948, he appeared in his first film, The Big Punch, a drama about boxing. He followed this with a film noir with Virginia Mayo, Backfire (made in 1948, released 1950).

MacRae's first on-screen musical was Look for the Silver Lining (1949), a biopic of Marilyn Miller (June Haver), where MacRae played Frank Carter. David Butler directed. MacRae was reunited with Haver and Butler in The Daughter of Rosie O'Grady (1950). Warners put him in a Western, Return of the Frontiersman (1950). Then he starred with Doris Day in Tea for Two (1950), a reworking of No, No, Nanette, also for Butler. Public response was enthusiastic. MacRae and Day were teamed again in The West Point Story (1951) starring James Cagney and Mayo, On Moonlight Bay (1951), and the all-star Korean War tribute, Starlift (1951).

MacRae was in a military school musical, About Face (1952) with Eddie Bracken, then he and Day did a sequel to On Moonlight Bay, By the Light of the Silvery Moon (1953). That same year, he starred opposite Kathryn Grayson in the third film version of The Desert Song and teamed with Jane Powell in Three Sailors and a Girl (1953). MacRae's best known film role was Curly in the big screen adaptation of Oklahoma! (1955) alongside Shirley Jones. He and Jones were used on another Rodgers and Hammerstein adaptation, Carousel (1956), at 20th Century Fox (now 20th Century Studios). MacRae played Buddy De Sylva in The Best Things in Life Are Free (1956) for 20th Century-Fox.

Television
MacRae appeared frequently on television, on such variety programs as The Ford Show, Starring Tennessee Ernie Ford.

He also appeared on drama shows such as Lux Video Theatre.

During Christmas 1958, MacRae and Ford performed the Christmas hymn "O Holy Night". Earlier in 1958, MacRae guest-starred on the short-lived NBC variety series The Polly Bergen Show.

He starred in the TV musical The Gift of the Magi (1958). Thereafter, MacRae appeared on The Ed Sullivan Show, The Dinah Shore Chevy Show, The Pat Boone Chevy Showroom, and The Bell Telephone Hour.

Stage
He continued his musical stage career, often performing with his wife, as in a 1964 production of Bells Are Ringing, also performing as Sky Masterson in the popular musical Guys and Dolls, with his wife playing the role of Miss Adeleide, reprising her Broadway role at the Gammage Memorial Auditorium in Tempe, Arizona.

In the late 1960s, he co-hosted for a week on The Mike Douglas Show. He also toured in summer stock and appeared in nightclubs.

In 1967, he replaced Robert Preston in the original Broadway run of the musical I Do! I Do!, starring opposite Carol Lawrence, who had taken over the role from Mary Martin.

Later career
MacRae guest starred on McCloud. He had supporting roles in the films Zero to Sixty (1978) and The Pilot (1980).

Personal life
He was married to Sheila MacRae from 1941 until 1967. They met on the set of a play and it was "love at first sight." The couple were the parents of four children: actresses Heather and Meredith MacRae, and sons William Gordon MacRae and Robert Bruce MacRae. Sheila later married television producer Ronald Wayne.

MacRae's second marriage was to Elizabeth Lambert Schrafft on September 25, 1967, and together they had one daughter, Amanda Mercedes MacRae born in 1968. They remained married until his death. He battled alcohol problems for many years, but overcame them by the late 1970s.

Death
MacRae suffered from cancer of the mouth and jaw. He died in 1986 of pneumonia, at his home in Lincoln, Nebraska, aged 64. He was buried at the Wyuka Cemetery in Lincoln, Nebraska.

Filmography

Stage work
 Junior Miss (1942, Broadway, replacement for Walter Collins)
 Three to Make Ready (1946, Broadway)
 Carousel (1955, Music Hall at Fair Park)
 Annie Get Your Gun (1960, Starlight Theatre)
 Bells Are Ringing (1961, Columbus, Ohio)
 Guys and Dolls (1963, summer stock tour)
 Bells Are Ringing (1964, summer stock tour)
 Jerome Kern's Theatre (1966, Avery Fisher Hall)
 Kismet (1966, Columbus, Ohio)
 Oklahoma! (1967, summer stock tour)
 I Do! I Do! (1967, Broadway, replacement for Robert Preston)
 Golden Rainbow (1969, summer stock tour)
 Milk and Honey (1972, Columbus, Ohio)
 Paint Your Wagon (1978, Columbus, Ohio)

Radio
MacRae replaced Frank Sinatra on a radio program in 1943, but he soon had to leave for military service. In 1946, he was the "singing emcee" of The Teentimers Club, a Saturday morning program. From 1945 to 1948 he also hosted and performed on The Gordon MacRae Show for the CBS radio network.

He also appeared in programs as shown in the table below.

Discography

This is Gordon Macrae Capitol Records

Solo
 "Love Is a Many Splendored Thing"
 "Easy to Love"
 "Hair of Gold, Eyes of Blue"
 "It's Magic"
 "Rambling Rose"
 "Love Is the Sweetest Thing"
 "Here's to a Wonderful Christmas"
 "The Merry Christmas Waltz"
 "The Secret"

with Jo Stafford
 "'A' — You're Adorable"
 "Dearie"
 "My Darling, My Darling"
 "Say Something Sweet to Your Sweetheart"
 "Whispering Hope"
 "Echoes"
 "There's a Small Hotel" (Jo Stafford album "Meet Jo Stafford")
 "When I Grow Too Old to Dream" (Jo Stafford album "Meet Jo Stafford")

Singles

In popular culture

 MacRae is mentioned in the song "Oklahoma U.S.A." by The Kinks, as the song's subject daydreams of "riding in the surrey with the fringe on top" with "Shirley Jones and Gordon MacRae".
 In a 1980 episode of Alice called "Dog Day Evening", Vera uses Gordon MacRae's name in a rhyming game.

References

Further reading
 Hollywood Mother of the Year – Sheila MacRae's Own Story, by Sheila MacRae & H. Paul Jeffreys. (Birch Lane Press, 1992) 
 Gordon MacRae: A Bio-Bibliography by Bruce B. Leiby. (Greenwood Press, 1991)

External links

 Appearance On What's My Line 9/30/62
 Gordon MacRae on NBCs "The Railroad Hour"
 Gordon MacRae Discography on CastAlbums.og
 Gordon MacRae Discography on PatFullerton.com
 Gordon MacRae Discography on Discog.com
 
 
 Gordon MacRae on MusicBrainz.org
 Biography  from Starpulse
 Gordon MacRae, "That Old MacRae Magic" by Frances Ingram

1921 births
1986 deaths
20th-century American male actors
American male film actors
American male musical theatre actors
American people of Scottish descent
Deaths from cancer in Nebraska
Capitol Records artists
Deaths from oral cancer
Nottingham High School (Syracuse, New York) alumni
Deerfield Academy alumni
Musicians from East Orange, New Jersey
United States Army Air Forces officers
Apollo Records artists
20th-century American singers
Warner Bros. contract players
Actors from Lincoln, Nebraska
Musicians from Lincoln, Nebraska
Actors from East Orange, New Jersey
20th-century American male singers
Traditional pop music singers
United States Army Air Forces personnel of World War II
Military personnel from New Jersey